Gerald Bright Croasdell (12 July 1916 – 15 July 1998) was a British trade union leader.

Croasdell grew up in Hampstead, and then studied law at Pembroke College, Cambridge.  He was President of the Cambridge Union in Lent term 1937, and was also a member of the Cambridge Apostles.  After graduation, he ran the youth section of the League of Nations Union, and campaigned on behalf of the Republican side in the Spanish Civil War.

During World War II, Croasdell served as a tank commander, then as an Army officer on board a ship in the Far East.  At the end of the war, he was made an Officer of the Order of the British Empire.  He spent time as a lawyer in private practice, but in 1950 became the legal officer of Equity.  He was soon also appointed the union's deputy general secretary, then, when in 1958 its general secretary died, he was elected to the post.

While Croasdell privately supported Marxism, as leader of the union he focused on taking a non-partisan role in negotiations.  In 1974, he moved to become general secretary of the International Federation of Actors, retiring in 1983.

References

1916 births
1998 deaths
Alumni of Pembroke College, Cambridge
British Army personnel of World War II
General Secretaries of Equity (trade union)
People from Hampstead
Presidents of the Cambridge Union
British Army officers